

The Prowler Jaguar is an American pseudo-warbird produced by Prowler Aviation of California for amateur construction. Originally designed and built by George Morse the prototype first flew on 17 March 1985, it is a two-seat low-wing monoplane. The aircraft has a retractable conventional landing gear and the recommended engine is a  conversion of a Rodeck V8.

Specifications (production kit)

References

Notes

Bibliography

External links
 Prowler Aviation

Homebuilt aircraft
1980s United States civil utility aircraft
Low-wing aircraft
Aircraft first flown in 1985
Single-engined tractor aircraft